1313 is the first album by Belgian RIO band Univers Zero, released in 1977. The original vinyl release (and 2008 remix by Didier de Roos, with bonus live track) was simply titled Univers Zero – it acquired the name 1313 because of its original catalog number.  The name stuck due to its connection with the later Present release entitled Triskaidekaphobie (fear of the number 13).

Track listing

Personnel

 Michel Berckmans: bassoon
 Daniel Denis: percussion
 Patrick Hanappier: violin, viola, pocket cello
 Roger Trigaux: guitar
 Emmanuel Nicaise: harmonium, spinet
 Christian Genet: double bass
 Marcel Dufrane: violin

References

External links
1313. 1313 at Univers Zero's official homepage.

Univers Zero albums
1977 debut albums
Instrumental rock albums